Community Change, formerly the Center for Community Change (CCC), is a progressive community organizing group active in the United States. It was founded in 1968 in response to civil rights concerns of the 1960s and to honor Robert F. Kennedy. The organization's stated mission is "to build the power and capacity of low-income people, especially low-income people of color, to change their communities and public policies for the better."

Activities
Community Change generally works in low-income areas, especially within communities of color, and attempts to create resident-based groups to work on local issues of concern. The organization sponsors internships and training programs in several areas, including community organizing, service learning, union organizing, electoral engagement, and youth/student organizing. The organization provides resources for grassroots groups including campaign strategy, funding and social media strategy. In 2004, through the collaboration with immigrant groups, Community Change organized the Fair Immigration Reform Movement that "empowered immigrants to speak out". Community Change has helped to create government programs like the Community Reinvestment Act and the food stamps program.

The organization seeks to create workplace environments that value family, to guarantee minimum wage, "unlock opportunities in the poorest communities, and increase income taxes for the wealthy.

The Center for Community Change launched the Fair Immigration Reform Movement (FIRM), an immigration reform movement working for comprehensive immigration reform. FIRM received funding from the Open Society Foundations and the Ford Foundation.

Funding 
Community Change has received funding from a range of progressive organizations including the Alliance for Early Success, Bill & Melinda Gates Foundation, Carnegie Corporation of New York, Center on Budget and Policy Priorities, Democracy Alliance, Every Citizen Counts, Human Rights Campaign, MoveOn, New America (organization), Planned Parenthood, the Tides Advocacy Fund, and The Voter Participation Center.

See also
Stephanie Land, a writing fellow for Community Change

References

External links 
 Community Change website
 FIRM website

Community building
Immigrant rights organizations in the United States
Civil rights organizations in the United States
Non-profit organizations based in Washington, D.C.
Organizations established in 1968
Political advocacy groups in the United States
Internship programs
Progressive organizations in the United States